Nils Gabriel Djurklou  (24 July 1829 – 31 March 1904) was a Swedish writer, archeologist, chamberlain and ethnologist.

Early years 
Djurklou was born in Norrbyås at Sörby Manor, near Örebro in Sweden, then part of the Union between Sweden and Norway.

He was a member of the Swedish aristocratic Djurklou family. His father, Baron Gabriel Djurklou (1780–1843), was a military personnel. Djurklou's mother, Baroness Christina Silfverschiöld (1790–1853), was the daughter of Nils Silfverschiöld.

Djurklou graduated from Uppsala University in 1854.

Career 
Djurklou published several books on folk life in Sweden. Furthermore, he founded a provincial vernacular and ancient monuments association in 1856, in Närke, the first of its kind in Sweden.

Djurklou was a member of the Royal Swedish Academy of Letters, History and Antiquities, starting in 1862 as a corresponding member, and in 1872 as a working member.

References 

1829 births
1904 deaths
Swedish ethnologists
Swedish nobility
Barons of Sweden
Chamberlains
19th-century Swedish writers
Uppsala University alumni
Swedish archaeologists